The Sound or The Sounds may refer to:

Film
 The Sound (film), a Canadian psychological thriller film

Geography
 The Sound or Øresund, the strait between Sweden and Denmark
 Plymouth Sound, the inlet of the English Channel at Plymouth, England
 Long Island Sound, the body of water between Connecticut and Long Island, United States
 Puget Sound, an inlet of the Pacific Ocean in the U.S. state of Washington
 The Sounds of the Outer Banks, North Carolina, these include Currituck Sound, Pamlico Sound, Albemarle Sound, Croatan Sound and Roanoke Sound.
 The Sound, a small cay rising above sea level at Middleton Reef in the Coral Sea Islands, Australia

Music
 The Sound (band), an English post-punk band
 The Sounds, a Swedish indie-rock band
 "The Sound", a nickname of the saxophonist Stan Getz
 "The Sound", a track from the Swans album Soundtracks for the Blind
 The Sound, 2007 album by Elevation Worship
 The Sound (Mary Mary album) (2008)
 The Sound (New Monsoon album) (2005)
 The Sound (Stray Kids album) (2023)
"The Sound" (John M. Perkins' Blues), a 2009 song by Switchfoot
"The Sound" (song), a 2016 song by the 1975
 "The Sound", a 2019 song by Carly Rae Jepsen from the album Dedicated

Radio
 KKLQ (FM) 100.3, a radio station in Los Angeles formerly known as "The Sound"
 The Sound (radio station), a radio station network in New Zealand

Television 
 The Sound (Australian TV series), Australian music program broadcast on the ABC
 The Sound (Chinese TV series), a Chinese reality series broadcast on Hunan TV

See also
 Sound (disambiguation)